Monica Lynn is an American composer who lives and works in the San Francisco Bay area. She graduated with a Bachelor of Music degree from the University of Texas at Austin, where she studied with Stefan Kostka, David Neumeyer and Forrest Pierce. She continued her education at the University of Missouri in Kansas City where she studied with James Mobberley, Paul Rudy, Chen Yi, Zhou Long, and at the University of California, Santa Cruz where she graduated with a Doctor of Musical Arts degree, studying with Ben Leeds Carson, David Cope, Karlton Hester, David Evan Jones, Hi Kyung Kim, Paul Nauert and Peter Elsea.

Lynn taught at the University of California at Santa Cruz while working on her degree. Her music has been performed internationally.

Honors and awards
2009-10: UCSC Grant; ASCAP Award
2008-09: European American Musical Alliance, Lindsay and Brian Shea Fellowship; Brevard Institute Scholarship Award; selected composer, South Oxford Six, Summer in Sombor, SERBIA; Finalist, College Music Society Pacific Central/Pacific Southern SuperRegional Conference; Finalist, California Summer Music, San Francisco, CA; UCSC Grant; ASCAP Award
2007-08: UCSC Graduate Student Association Scholarship Award; UCSC Doctoral Tuition and Fee Fellowship
2006-07: UCSC Chancellor’s Doctoral Fellowship Award, UCSC Doctoral Tuition and Fee Fellowship, UCSC Porter Graduate Arts Research Grant, UMKC Student Government Association Scholarship Award
2005-06: George D. Martin III Scholarship Award, Mary Margaret Miller Graduate Assistance Endowment Fund Award,	Presidents General Assembly of Greater Kansas City Award, Virginia French Mackie Award, The Walden School Scholarship Award
2004-05: Jarene Stanford Graduate Achievement Fellowship, Nancy Kassebaum Baker Graduate Achievement Fellowship, UMKC Chancellor’s Fellowship Award, The Walden School Scholarship Award
2003-04: William L. and Caroline M. French Graduate Achievement Fellowship, UMKC Chancellor’s Fellowship Award

Works
Selected works include:

Unole Dayai, for chamber ensemble
Le synchronisme, pour l’harpe en solo
The Words Under the Words, for SATB a cappella chorus
Taiheiyo, for Japanese koto
Mirror Images, for string quartet
Sylvia, for flute and piano
Anabatic, for chamber orchestra
Rejuvenancient, for chamber ensemble
Ye Xiang Gu, for Chinese gu-zheng and Western percussion
Sylvia, for flute and marimba
Half-moon Rising, for percussion quartet
Han-ji, for Korean gayageum
Breaking Symmetry, for wind ensemble
Sylvia Silenced, for marimba duo
Symmetry, for chamber orchestra
Escaping Constraint, for percussion quartet
Balloons, for solo marimba
Soliloquy, for solo clarinet
Crosstalk, duet for flute and clarinet
After Words, for solo flute
Sylvia Silenced, for piano solo
Metal Raindrops, electronic
Chaos, electronic
Submerged, electronic

References

Year of birth missing (living people)
20th-century classical composers
American women classical composers
American classical composers
American music educators
American women music educators
Living people
University of California, Santa Cruz faculty
20th-century American women musicians
20th-century American composers
20th-century women composers
21st-century American women